Miz Cracker (born April 19, 1984) is the stage name of Maxwell Elias Heller, an American drag queen and television personality. He is best known for placing fifth on the tenth season of RuPaul's Drag Race and for being a runner-up on the fifth season of RuPaul's Drag Race All Stars.

Early life 
Maxwell Heller was born in Seattle. His parents were former members of the Lubavitch community. He also has a sister, Sylvia. Heller left Seattle at eighteen years old. He attended The Evergreen State College, designing his own major.

In 2011, while in her mid-20s, Miz Cracker met Bob the Drag Queen. As he later wrote, "I was staggering home through a blizzard one night when I spotted a very handsome oversized man hauling a very broken oversized bookshelf down the street." He helped Bob the Drag Queen move the bookshelf into his apartment, where he found "...diva’s accessories, wigs and gowns draped across the threadbare furniture, glittering crowns and bras hanging from a dusty chandelier." The two developed a friendship and Bob became his drag mother, which included attending her drag shows, providing feedback, and helping Miz Cracker gain confidence as a performer. Miz Cracker participated in marches for equality in Times Square with Bob the Drag Queen.

Career
Heller started his career as Brianna Cracker, but, when another performer took the name, he donned the name “Miss Cracker”. However, when trying to make a Facebook account with that name, it denied “Miss” as an appropriate first name, so Heller changed it to “Miz”.

Miz Cracker was announced as one of fourteen contestants competing on the tenth season of RuPaul's Drag Race on February 22, 2018. She won the episode ten main challenge after doing a makeover on Chester See. She was eliminated an episode later after losing a lip sync to "Nasty Girl" by Vanity 6 to eventual runner-up Kameron Michaels.

She has a homemade web series, Review with a Jew, where she recaps episodes of Drag Race, starting from All Stars season three. The series debuted on January 31, 2018. Alexandra Pucciarelli from Alma wrote the series is "always hilarious."

Miz Cracker was featured with alumni Tammie Brown, Ginger Minj, Jasmine Masters, Shea Couleé, and Eureka O'Hara for the Billboard web series "Spillin' the Tea" on June 13, 2018. She was introduced as the host of her own WoWpresents web series, "JewTorials" on June 26, 2018. She has also appeared three times on the Bon Appétit YouTube channel cooking with Carla Lalli Music.

Miz Cracker has written regularly for Slate since 2014, and in 2016, she received the National Lesbian and Gay Journalists Association's Excellence in Column Writing award. Miz Cracker was nominated with Aquaria for the "Competition Contestant of 2018" for the 2018 People's Choice Awards.

In early 2019, she finished her one-woman show called "It's Time", which she performed across the UK. Billboard stated, "The show touched on her struggle with addiction during her early 20s, with a little bit of "Cracker-brand" comedy sprinkled in." Miz Cracker was added to the Drag Race "Haters Roast: The Shady Tour" comedy tour with other alumnae in 2019.

On May 8, 2020, Miz Cracker was announced as one of ten drag queens who would compete in the fifth season of RuPaul's Drag Race All Stars. She won three main challenges, on episodes 4, 6 and 7, and was in the bottom for the snatch game on episode 5. She placed as a runner-up, together with Jujubee.

In 2020, Miz Cracker launched a podcast titled She's a Woman with Studio71.

Music 
Miz Cracker worked with Alexis Michelle, Lady Sinagaga, and Sherry Vine to create "Jappy", a cover of Pharrell Williams "Happy".

Personal life
Heller is Jewish. He resides in Harlem, Manhattan, and has a black belt in karate. Before Drag Race, he worked as a school teacher in Senegal and speaks Wolof. He held a fundraiser for LGBT rights in Uganda in 2016.

Heller was robbed of his money and ID card while on tour in Dublin, Ireland, on August 10, 2018.

Discography

Singles

As lead artist

As featured artist

Filmography

Television

Web series

See also
 LGBT culture in New York City
 List of LGBT Jews
 List of LGBT people from New York City

References

External links 

 
 , Cosmopolitan (March 18, 2018)
 , BuzzFeedVideo (April 3, 2018)

Living people
1984 births
American drag queens
American people of Russian-Jewish descent
American YouTubers
Jewish American entertainers
LGBT Jews
LGBT people from New York (state)
LGBT people from Washington (state)
American LGBT writers
LGBT YouTubers
People from Harlem
Miz Cracker
Miz Cracker
20th-century LGBT people
21st-century LGBT people
Evergreen State College alumni